Graterol is a surname. Notable people with the surname include:

Beiker Graterol (born 1974), Venezuelan baseball player
Brusdar Graterol (born 1998), Venezuelan baseball player
Joel Graterol (born 1997), Venezuelan footballer
Juan Graterol (born 1989), Venezuelan baseball player
Windi Graterol (born 1986), Venezuelan basketball player